Tatianaerhynchites is a genus of beetles belonging to the family Rhynchitidae.

The species of this genus are found in Europe.

Species:
 Tatianaerhynchites aequatus (Linnaeus, 1767)

References

Attelabidae
Beetle genera